The 2017 Teng Tools Swedish FIM Speedway Grand Prix was the seventh race of the 2017 Speedway Grand Prix season. It took place on August 12 at the G&B Stadium in Målilla, Sweden.

Riders 
First reserve Peter Kildemand replaced Nicki Pedersen and second reserve Martin Smolinski replaced Greg Hancock. The Speedway Grand Prix Commission also nominated Linus Sundström as the wild card, and Kim Nilsson and Joel Kling both as Track Reserves.

Results 
The Grand Prix was won by Poland's Bartosz Zmarzlik, who beat Antonio Lindbäck, Fredrik Lindgren and Maciej Janowski in the final. Lindbäck and Lindgren had top scored during the qualifying heats and then won each of the semi-finals, however the former was passed by Zmarzlik on the final bend of the decider. Janowkski took the lead in the overall standings after finishing fourth, while title rivals Jason Doyle and Patryk Dudek both failed to make the semi-finals.

Heat details

Intermediate classification

References

See also 
 Motorcycle speedway

Sweden
Speedway Grand Prix
2017 in Swedish motorsport
Speedway Grand Prix of Sweden